The 1984–85 County Championship was the 43rd season of the Liga IV, the fourth tier of the Romanian football league system. The champions of each county association play against one from a neighboring county in a play-off  to gain promotion to Divizia C.

Promotion play-off 
Teams promoted to Divizia C without a play-off matches as teams from less represented counties in the third division.

 (IL) Unirea Urziceni
 (SJ) Chimia Victoria Zalău
 (BT) Cristalul Dorohoi

 Ilfov County did not enter a team in the play-offs.

The matches was played on 7 and 14 July 1985.

County leagues

Arad County 
Seria A

Seria B

Championship final 
The matches was played on 11 and 15 June 1985.

Strungul Chișineu-Criș won the 1984–85 Arad County Championship and qualify for promotion play-off in Divizia C.

Hunedoara County

Maramureș County 
North Series

South Series

Championship final 
The championship final was played on 13 June 1985 at CIL Stadium in Sighetu Marmației.

Recolta Rozavlea won the 1984–85 Liga IV Maramureș County and qualify to promotion play-off in Divizia C.

Neamț County

See also 
 1984–85 Divizia A
 1984–85 Divizia B
 1984–85 Cupa României

References

External links
 

Liga IV seasons
4
Romania